MDR Klassik is a German public radio station owned and operated by the Mitteldeutscher Rundfunk (MDR).

References

Mitteldeutscher Rundfunk
Radio stations in Germany
Radio stations established in 2002
2002 establishments in Germany
Mass media in Halle (Saale)